Dunbeholden F.C. are a Jamaican football club competing in the National Premier League, gaining promotion for the 2018–19 season.

Players

Current squad

Other players under contract

References

National Premier League teams

Football clubs in Jamaica